Óscar Meléndez Sauri (born 21 March 1966, San Juan, Puerto Rico) is a Puerto Rican singer and former member of boy band Menudo.

Óscar is one of the five original members of Menudo, and the first cousin of group creator Edgardo Diaz.  His older brother, Carlos Meléndez and younger brother, Ricky Meléndez, were also part of the original group.  He was recruited by Edgardo when the group was founded in 1977, and left in 1981 at the age of 15, barely missing out on what would become the group's golden era.

Unlike his brothers, when his career with Menudo ended, he decided not to pursue any other endeavors in the music industry and went back to living a private life. Melendez is, like brother Ricky, a lawyer who works in Puerto Rico.

In pop culture 
Melendez is played by Jossan Sebastian Lopez in the 2020 Amazon Prime Video series based on Menudo, "Subete A Mi Moto".

Discography

With Menudo 
 Los Fantasmas (1977)
 Laura (1978)
 Chiquitita (1979)
 Felicidades (1979)
 Mas Mucho Mas (1980)
 Es Navidad (1980)

References 

1966 births
Living people
People from San Juan, Puerto Rico
Menudo (band) members
20th-century Puerto Rican male singers
Puerto Rican lawyers